Daniela "Danny" Kanyanya Ngoyi (born 27 February 1999) is a DR Congolese footballer who plays for Tanzanian club Simba Queens and the DR Congo women's national team.

Club career
Ngoyi has played for JSK Lualuaba in the Democratic Republic of the Congo.

International career
Ngoyi capped for the DR Congo at senior level during the 2020 CAF Women's Olympic Qualifying Tournament (third round).

See also
 List of Democratic Republic of the Congo women's international footballers

References

1999 births
Living people
Democratic Republic of the Congo women's footballers
Women's association football defenders
TP Mazembe players
Simba S.C. players
Democratic Republic of the Congo women's international footballers
Democratic Republic of the Congo expatriate footballers
Democratic Republic of the Congo expatriate sportspeople in Tanzania
Expatriate women's footballers in Tanzania
21st-century Democratic Republic of the Congo people